William Edmund Newton Sinclair (June 28, 1873 – November 26, 1947), known as W. E. N. Sinclair, was a Canadian barrister, solicitor and interim leader of the Ontario Liberal Party.

Background
Sinclair was born in Whitby Township, Ontario, the son of John Sinclair, and was educated at Toronto University, receiving a bachelor's degree in law. In 1907, he married Ella Minerva Montgomery; he married Edna Worden in 1918 after his first wife's death.

Politics
Sinclair was first elected to the Legislative Assembly of Ontario as a candidate of the Ontario Liberal Party in the 1911 provincial election but was defeated in 1914.

He returned to politics in the 1917 federal election on conscription (see Conscription Crisis of 1917), Sinclair ran on as part of the anti-conscription "Laurier Liberals" but was again defeated.

He returned to provincial politics and was elected again to the Ontario legislature in the 1919 provincial election as the MLA for the riding of Ontario South.

Sinclair ran for the leadership of the party in the 1922 leadership convention, but lost to Wellington Hay. Hay resigned following a disastrous election result, and Sinclair served as interim leader of the Ontario Liberal Party from 1923 to 1930 and also as Leader of the Opposition in the provincial legislature. He was interim leader for that length of time (and through the elections of 1926 and 1929) because of the party's state of disorganization and inability to hold a proper leadership convention.

The Liberals remained at the 14 seats they had in 1926, and dropped to 13 seats in the 1929 election. Sinclair initially decided to run for the permanent leadership in 1930, but because of the party's failure to make gains during his tenure, he attracted little support, and withdrew before balloting began. He remained Leader of the Opposition until the 1934 election because the newly elected leader, Mitchell Hepburn, did not have a seat in the provincial legislature. Sinclair was re-elected in the 1934 election that brought the Liberals to power but Hepburn, the new Premier of Ontario, did not appoint him to Cabinet. Sinclair sat as a government backbencher for three years and then retired from the legislature at the 1937 provincial election.

In the 1945 federal election, Sinclair was elected to the House of Commons of Canada for the Liberal Party of Canada. He died in office in 1947.

Sinclair also served as mayor of Oshawa from 1910 to 1911, in 1915 and from 1932 to 1934.

References 
 Canadian Parliamentary Guide, 1922, EJ Chambers

External links
 
 

1873 births
1947 deaths
Canadian Presbyterians
Ontario Liberal Party MPPs
Members of the House of Commons of Canada from Ontario
Liberal Party of Canada MPs
Leaders of the Ontario Liberal Party
Mayors of Oshawa
University of Toronto alumni